The 1995 Peach Bowl, part of the 1994 bowl game season, featured the Mississippi State Bulldogs and the NC State Wolfpack.

NC State held Mississippi State to just one touchdown and five field goals on six Bulldog drives that reached the Wolfpack red zone during the game. Leading 13–10, the Bulldogs went three-and-out and missed a field goal late in the second quarter. The Wolfpack got the ball back and tied the game at 13 going into halftime.

After MSU picked up a safety and two field goals early in the third quarter, NC State tied the game at 21 on a touchdown pass from Terry Harvey to Dallas Dickerson and a two-point run by Harvey. After a three-and-out by MSU, Harvey led the Wolfpack on an 80-yard scoring drive to open the fourth quarter, largely based on a 62-yard pass to Jimmy Grissett, capped by a Carlos King 11-yard touchdown run.

On four subsequent drives over the balance of the fourth quarter, Mississippi State managed only four first downs and a field goal. The Bulldogs went 0-for-7 on third-down conversions and 0-for-1 on fourth-down tries in the second half.

With the win, NC State tied a school record with nine wins.

References

Peach Bowl
Peach Bowl
Mississippi State Bulldogs football bowl games
NC State Wolfpack football bowl games
January 1995 sports events in the United States
1995 in sports in Georgia (U.S. state)
1995 in Atlanta